George Kirby (1923–1995) was an American comedian, singer, and actor.

George Kirby may also refer to:
George Kirby (baseball) (born 1998), American baseball player
George Kirby (curator) (1845–1937), British academic and curator of the York Art Gallery
George Kirby (footballer) (1933–2000), English football (soccer) player and manager
George Hughes Kirby (1875–1935), American physician and psychiatrist

See also
George Kirbye (c. 1565–1634), English composer